The 2001 Pacific Curling Championships were held from November 6 to 10 at the Jeonju Indoor Ice Rink in Jeonju, South Korea. 

Japan's Hiroaki Kashiwagi won the men's event over New Zealand's Sean Becker (it was the second Pacific title for the Japanese men's team and the first title for skip Hiroaki Kashiwagi). On the women's side, South Korea's Kim Mi-yeon defeated Japan's Akiko Katoh in the final (it was the first Pacific title for the South Korean women).   

By virtue of winning, the Japanese men's team and the South Korean women's team qualified for the 2002 World  and  Curling Championships in Bismarck, North Dakota, United States.

It was the first appearance at the Pacific championships for the men's and women's teams of Chinese Taipei.

Men

Teams

Round robin standings
Final Round Robin Standings

Playoffs

Semifinal

Final

Final standings

Women

Teams

Round robin standings
Final Round Robin Standings

Playoffs

Semifinal

Final

Final standings

References

External links

Pacific Curling Championships, 2001
Pacific-Asia Curling Championships
International curling competitions hosted by South Korea
2001 in South Korean sport
Sports competitions in Jeonju
November 2001 sports events in Asia